Epstein's Shadow: Ghislaine Maxwell is an American-British Documentary miniseries revolving around Ghislaine Maxwell and her association with convicted sex offender Jeffrey Epstein. It consists of three episodes and premiered in the United States on June 24, 2021, on Peacock and in the United Kingdom on June 28, 2021, on Sky Documentaries.

Plot
The series follows Ghislaine Maxwell and her association with convicted sex offender Jeffrey Epstein, leading to her arrest and upcoming trial, prior to her conviction.

Episodes

Production
In May 2021, it was announced Barbara Shearer had directed a 3-episode limited series revolving around Ghislaine Maxwell and her association with convicted sex offender Jeffrey Epstein, with Peacock and Sky Documentaries, to distribute in the United States and United Kingdom, respectively, and Abacus Media Rights distributing worldwide.

References

External links
 

2021 American television series debuts
2021 American television series endings
2021 British television series debuts
2021 British television series endings
2020s American documentary television series
2020s British documentary television series
2020s American television miniseries
2020s British television miniseries
Peacock (streaming service) original programming
Jeffrey Epstein
Films about child sexual abuse
Ghislaine Maxwell